{{DISPLAYTITLE:1 22 polytope}}

In 6-dimensional geometry, the 122 polytope is a uniform polytope, constructed from the E6 group. It was first published in E. L. Elte's 1912 listing of semiregular polytopes, named as V72 (for its 72 vertices).

Its Coxeter symbol is 122, describing its bifurcating Coxeter-Dynkin diagram, with a single ring on the end of the 1-node sequence. There are two rectifications of the 122, constructed by positions points on the elements of 122. The rectified 122 is constructed by points at the mid-edges of the 122. The birectified 122 is constructed by points at the triangle face centers of the 122.

These polytopes are from a family of 39 convex uniform polytopes in 6-dimensions, made of uniform polytope facets and vertex figures, defined by all permutations of rings in this Coxeter-Dynkin diagram: .

122 polytope 

The 122 polytope contains 72 vertices, and 54 5-demicubic facets. It has a birectified 5-simplex vertex figure. Its 72 vertices represent the root vectors of the simple Lie group E6.

Alternate names 
 Pentacontatetra-peton (Acronym Mo) - 54-facetted polypeton (Jonathan Bowers)

Images

Construction 

It is created by a Wythoff construction upon a set of 6 hyperplane mirrors in 6-dimensional space.

The facet information can be extracted from its Coxeter-Dynkin diagram, .

Removing the node on either of 2-length branches leaves the 5-demicube, 131, .

The vertex figure is determined by removing the ringed node and ringing the neighboring node. This makes the birectified 5-simplex, 022, .

Seen in a configuration matrix, the element counts can be derived by mirror removal and ratios of Coxeter group orders.

Related complex polyhedron 

The regular complex polyhedron 3{3}3{4}2, in  has a real representation as the 122 polytope in 4-dimensional space. It has 72 vertices, 216 3-edges, and 54 3{3}3 faces. Its complex reflection group is 3[3]3[4]2, order 1296.

Related polytopes and honeycomb 
Along with the semiregular polytope, 221, it is also one of a family of 39 convex uniform polytopes in 6-dimensions, made of uniform polytope facets and vertex figures, defined by all permutations of rings in this Coxeter-Dynkin diagram: .

Geometric folding 

The 122 is related to the 24-cell by a geometric folding E6 → F4 of Coxeter-Dynkin diagrams, E6 corresponding to 122 in 6 dimensions, F4 to the 24-cell in 4 dimensions. This can be seen in the Coxeter plane projections. The 24 vertices of the 24-cell are projected in the same two rings as seen in the 122.

Tessellations 
This polytope is the vertex figure for a uniform tessellation of 6-dimensional space, 222, .

Rectified 122 polytope 

The rectified 122 polytope (also called 0221) can tessellate 6-dimensional space as the Voronoi cell of the E6* honeycomb lattice (dual of E6 lattice).

Alternate names 
 Birectified 221 polytope
 Rectified pentacontatetrapeton (acronym Ram) - rectified 54-facetted polypeton (Jonathan Bowers)

Images 

Vertices are colored by their multiplicity in this projection, in progressive order: red, orange, yellow.

Construction 

Its construction is based on the E6 group and information can be extracted from the ringed Coxeter-Dynkin diagram representing this polytope: .

Removing the ring on the short branch leaves the birectified 5-simplex, .

Removing the ring on the either 2-length branch leaves the birectified 5-orthoplex in its alternated form: t2(211), .

The vertex figure is determined by removing the ringed node and ringing the neighboring ring. This makes 3-3 duoprism prism, {3}×{3}×{}, .

Seen in a configuration matrix, the element counts can be derived by mirror removal and ratios of Coxeter group orders.

Truncated 122 polytope

Alternate names 
 Truncated 122 polytope

Construction 

Its construction is based on the E6 group and information can be extracted from the ringed Coxeter-Dynkin diagram representing this polytope: .

Images 

Vertices are colored by their multiplicity in this projection, in progressive order: red, orange, yellow.

Birectified 122 polytope

Alternate names 
 Bicantellated 221
 Birectified pentacontitetrapeton (barm) (Jonathan Bowers)

Images 
Vertices are colored by their multiplicity in this projection, in progressive order: red, orange, yellow.

Trirectified 122 polytope

Alternate names 
 Tricantellated 221
 Trirectified pentacontitetrapeton (trim or cacam) (Jonathan Bowers)

See also 
 List of E6 polytopes

Notes

References 
 
 H. S. M. Coxeter, Regular Polytopes, 3rd Edition, Dover New York, 1973
 Kaleidoscopes: Selected Writings of H.S.M. Coxeter, edited by F. Arthur Sherk, Peter McMullen, Anthony C. Thompson, Asia Ivic Weiss, Wiley-Interscience Publication, 1995,  
 (Paper 24) H.S.M. Coxeter, Regular and Semi-Regular Polytopes III, [Math. Zeit. 200 (1988) 3-45] See p334 (figure 3.6a) by Peter mcMullen: (12-gonal node-edge graph of 122)
  o3o3o3o3o *c3x - mo, o3o3x3o3o *c3o - ram, o3x3o3x3o *c3o - barm

6-polytopes